McLean Bible Church is an evangelical, multi-site megachurch with several locations in the Washington, DC metropolitan area. Its largest campus is located in Tysons Corner, Virginia with other sites in Leesburg, Prince William County, Arlington, and Rockville, Maryland

History

McLean Bible Church was founded in 1961 by five families in Northern Virginia. Its first service was held on Easter Sunday at Chesterbook Elementary School in McLean with Pastor J. Albert Ford.

Senior Pastor Lon Solomon was born and raised in a Jewish home in Portsmouth, Virginia, before becoming a born again Christian in the spring of 1971. He graduated from the University of North Carolina with a B.S. in chemistry (1971). He then completed a Th.M. degree in Hebrew and Old Testament at Capital Bible Seminary (1975, summa cum laude) in Lanham, Maryland. He completed graduate work at Johns Hopkins University, receiving a master's degree in Near Eastern Studies in 1979.

Solomon taught Hebrew and Old Testament at Capital Bible Seminary from 1975 to 1980. In 1980, he became the senior pastor at McLean Bible Church. Solomon has been on the board of Jews for Jesus since 1987, where he now serves as chairman of the board's executive committee.

In September 2002, Solomon was appointed by President George W. Bush to serve in his administration as a member of the President's Committee on Intellectual Disabilities. He received a Doctorate of Divinity degree from Liberty Baptist Theological Seminary in 2005. Solomon is the author of the books Brokenness: How God Redeems Pain and Suffering and The 23rd Psalm for the 21st Century.

In December 2017, Lon Solomon started his own ministry, Lon Solomon Ministries.

In September 2017, David Platt was confirmed as the Pastor-Teacher, later "Lead Pastor", replacing Lon Solomon by being the sole candidate offered to the membership.

Under the leadership of Platt, McLean has also been the broadcast location for several Radical (David Platt's resource ministry) simulcasts.

According to a church census released in 2018, it claimed a weekly attendance of 10,510 people and 5 campuses in different cities.  According to the MBC March 2022 Congregational Meeting Report weekly attendance for 2021 was 8,858.

On June 2, 2019, McLean made national headlines when then-President Donald Trump made an unplanned visit. After playing golf nearby, Trump appeared on-stage at the Tyson's Corner campus after communion. Pastor Platt prayed for him.

In 2020, in response to the global pandemic, the church moved all their ministry online and met physical needs for people all over greater Washington, DC, giving away boxes of food, toiletries, and soap, totaling 5.6 million meals.

A new shared leadership structure for MBC was introduced between three lead pastors (David Platt, Wade Burnett, Mike Kelsey) serving under the leadership of church elders.

In the summer of 2021 the church held their annual elder election.   For the first time in its 60-year history the elders were rejected by the congregation.

References

External links
 

Evangelical churches in Virginia
Christian organizations established in 1961
Evangelical megachurches in the United States
Megachurches in Virginia
McLean, Virginia
Evangelical churches in Maryland
Evangelical churches in Washington, D.C.
Churches in Fairfax County, Virginia
1961 establishments in Virginia
Non-denominational Evangelical multisite churches
Churches in Loudoun County, Virginia
Churches in Montgomery County, Maryland
Buildings and structures in Prince William County, Virginia
Churches in Arlington County, Virginia
Megachurches in Maryland